Michael Bernd Schmidt (born 6 March 1968), better known as Smudo, is a German rapper and songwriter in the hip hop group Die Fantastischen Vier.

References

External links

 Official website
 Smudo on Discogs
 Smudo on IMDb

 

1968 births
Living people
German rappers
People from Offenbach am Main
Die Fantastischen Vier

Racing drivers from Hesse
Nürburgring 24 Hours drivers